Shane McRae (born July 23, 1977) is an American actor. In 2017, McRae joined the cast of the Amazon Studios series Sneaky Pete in the role of Taylor. He also played Dickie Barrett in the Spectrum Original series Paradise Lost.

Early life and education 
McRae was born in Gainesville, Florida, and grew up in Starkville, Mississippi. He earned his MFA from New York University in 2003.

Career 
McRae played Bobby in NBC's Four Kings and has appeared in Hack, One Life to Live, Law & Order: Criminal Intent, Cold Case and Nashville and had a recurring role in Chicago Fire and The Following as Robert.

Onstage, McRae played the part of Jason Chenier in the play Take Me Out. In 2005, McRae appeared in The Public Theatre’s Richard III  as Richard's nemesis, Richmond. McRae also voiced various characters in Seth Green's Robot Chicken.

He starred in the 2008 film The Collective and co-starred with Kelly Overton in the music video for the song "Terrified" by Katharine McPhee with Zachary Levi. In 2011, he appeared in The Help as Raleigh Leefolt. In 2012, he had a starring role as Josh Shiffman in One Small Hitch. He also appeared in the CW series Gossip Girl. In 2021 He played Charlie ‘Lucky’ Luciano in Lansky. other film roles include Still Alice, The Adjustment Bureau, Bad Teacher, and Modern Persuasion.

Filmography

Film

Television

References

External links
 

1977 births
American male soap opera actors
American male stage actors
American male television actors
Living people
University of Evansville alumni
Male actors from Gainesville, Florida
Male actors from Florida
Tisch School of the Arts alumni
21st-century American male actors
20th-century American male actors
American male film actors